Circus is a 2009 Kannada-language comedy thriller film directed and produced by Dayal Padmanabhan who previously acted with Ganesh in Gaalipata. It stars Ganesh and Archana Gupta Emil Mohammed composed the songs and background score for the film, where it was released on 15 January 2009 coinciding with Makara Sankranthi.

Plot
Dhanush is a fun-loving youngster, who along with his friends live in the railway colony and their meeting point is the railway station. They decide to play a prank by sending a letter stating on a particular date a train travelling from Mysore to Bangalore will be exploded. However, they realize that one of the friend's address is posted on the letter. 

In a hurry, they get into the RMS boggie of the train where they discovers that a real plot has been hatched by the terrorists to blow up the Gandhadagudi express on the same day, where they decide to locate them and foil the plan. During their journey, Dhanush and his friends take a break at one of the houses where Priya and Dhanush fall for each other. After an intense search, Dhanush and his gang identify the terrorists where they manage to kill them with the help of ATS officers.

Cast

Soundtrack

The official soundtrack contains six songs composed by Emil Mohammed  with lyrics penned by Kaviraj, Yogaraj Bhat and Manjunath Rao. The audio of the film released on 15 December 2008. The opening lines of the song Jeeva Hoovagide was used from the popular song of same name (I Love You) from the 1981 movie Nee Nanna Gellalare.

Reception

Critical response 
Circus received mixed to positive reviews from critics and audience. 

R G Vijayasarathy of Rediff.com scored the film at 3 out of 5 stars and says "Ganesh has excelled in his role. He has put in a lot of effort in the stunts. He also shows his class as an actor. Newcomer Archana Gupta looks cute on screen, but she is found wanting in the acting department. Mithra, Avinash Bharadwaj, Murali have done well. Sadhu Kokila has done similar type of roles in many films. The gang of baddies also have done a good job. Circus may not be a top class thriller but still has enough entertaining arsenal to please film fans. Watch it if you love thrillers". The Times of India wrote "The story takes curious turn when one of them is kidnapped by terrorists who wanted to blast the train. The prank turns out to be a serious problem. Ganesh has given an excellent performance. Archana Gupta is a waste. Sadhu Kokila shines". Bangalore Mirror wrote "The excessive focus on Ganesh continues while other seasoned actors hardly get to mouth a sentence. The sketchy characters of the terrorists and the lack of momentum pulls down the film. Despite the drawbacks, Circus is worth a watch".

Box office 
The film was declared as an average grosser by completing 50 days at the box office.

Home media
The satellite rights of the film were sold to Star Suvarna and was released on DVD with 5.1 channel surround sound with English subtitles and VCD.

References

External links
 

2009 films
2000s Kannada-language films
Films set in Karnataka
Films directed by Dayal Padmanabhan